The Cayman Islands sent 39 athletes (33 males, 6 females) to the XXIst Central American and Caribbean Games in Mayagüez, Puerto Rico, July 17 - August 1, 2010.

The athletes participated in athletics (10), beach volleyball (2), equestrian (1), karate do (1), rugby (12), sailing (3), squash (4) and swimming (6).

Medalists

Gold
Shaune Fraser, Swimming (Men's 200 Free)

Silver
Brett Fraser,  Swimming (Men's 200 Free)
Brett Fraser,  Swimming (Men's 200 Back)

Bronze
Shaune Fraser, Swimming (Men's 100 Free)

Results by event

Athletics

Beach Volleyball

Equestrian

Karate Do

Rugby

Sailing

Squash

Swimming

Lara Butler (f)
Summer Flowers (f)
Tori Flowers (f)
Brett Fraser (m)
Shaune Fraser (m)
Seije Groome (m)

References

External links

Nations at the 2010 Central American and Caribbean Games
2010
2010 in Caymanian sport